Reggie Cole is a former West Indian cricket umpire from Jamaica. He stood in one Test match, West Indies vs. India, in 1962. In all, he umpired 11 first-class matches, all of them in Kingston, Jamaica, between 1958 and 1972.

See also
 List of Test cricket umpires
 Indian cricket team in West Indies in 1961–62

References

Year of birth missing
Possibly living people
Place of birth missing
West Indian Test cricket umpires